Richard Smallwood may refer to:

 Richard Smallwood (doctor), former Chief Medical Officer of Australia
 Richard Smallwood (footballer), English footballer
 Richard Smallwood (musician), American gospel musician